Hagibis is the debut self-titled studio album by the first Filipino boyband Hagibis formed by leader, songwriter/composer and producer Mike Hanopol of Juan de la Cruz Band. Released on Blackgold Records (a sublabel of Vicor)

Track listing

Credits
According to the album liner notes
Hagibis
Sonny Parsons - vocals
Bernie Fineza - vocals
Mike Respall - vocals
Joji Garcia - vocals
Mon Picazzo - vocals
Personnel
Mike Hanopol - vocals, arranger (rhythm section)
Vic Jose - associate producer
Lorrie Illustre - arranger (strings & bass)
Panting Katindig - congas
 Nardi Manalastas - coordinator (strings & bass)
 Joe Katindig - cowbell
 Jun Regalado - drums
 Vic del Rosario Jr. - executive producer

References

1979 debut albums
Manila sound albums